Eudonia rectilineata is a moth in the family Crambidae. It was described by Wei-Chun Li, Hou-Hun Li and Matthias Nuss in 2012. It is found in China (Gansu, Inner Mongolia, Ningxia, Qinghai, Sichuan).

The length of the forewings is 7–9.5 mm. The forewings are somewhat suffused with pale brown to blackish-brown scales. There is a blackish-brown stripe basally and the antemedian, postmedian and subterminal lines are white. The hindwings are white to pale brown.

Etymology
The species name refers to the forewing with posterior two thirds of the postmedian line straight and is derived from Latin rectus (meaning straight) and lineatus (meaning linear).

References

Moths described in 2012
Eudonia